Hylemeridia is a genus of moths in the family Geometridae erected by Louis Beethoven Prout in 1915.

Species
 Hylemeridia eurymelanotes Prout, 1915
 Hylemeridia majuscula Prout, 1915
 Hylemeridia nigricosta Prout, 1915

References

Geometridae